Sutton Coldfield Grammar School for Girls (formerly Sutton Coldfield High School and Sutton Coldfield Girls School) is an 11–18 girls secondary grammar school and sixth form with academy status in Sutton Coldfield, Birmingham, West Midlands, England. It is a specialist Science College and a Leadership Partner School which it received in September 2004 and 2009 respectively, as well as a Beacon School. It became an academy in 2011.

History
It was opened on 18 September 1929 as Sutton Coldfield High School. Plans for a school had begun in 1906 with sites behind Sutton Coldfield Town Hall, in Sutton Park and Rectory Park all being considered before a  field behind Beeches Walk was selected. It became Sutton Coldfield Girls School in 1962 and then changed its name to Sutton Coldfield Grammar School for Girls in the late 1990s. It is a partner school to Bishop Vesey's Grammar School which was founded in 1527.

In September 1972, there was no intake to the school as its entry age was increased from 11 to 12. However, the entry age was reverted to 11 from September 1992, when two-year groups (11- and 12-year-olds) were admitted to the school.

Academic performance
The 2007 examination results were well above the national average in both GCSEs and A-levels. The school received outstanding in the 2007/2008 inspection.

Subjects
The school has a wide variety of subject choices. English, Maths, Science, History, Geography, French, Drama, Music, PE, RE, Computing, Art, D&T and Food Technology are all compulsory in year 7. In year 8 the students must study Spanish and Science is split into 3 subjects: Chemistry, Physics, and Biology. At GCSE the students have a choice of 4 subjects alongside the compulsory English, Maths, Sciences with one of these four choices being an available language on option, French or Spanish. RE used to be a compulsory GCSE, taken a year early, in year 10, but this was stopped when the syllabus changed. At A Level, subjects such as Sociology, Psychology, Drama, and Media Studies are offered.

Houses
The school had five houses: Arden, Nevil, Tudor, Vesey, and Warwick. The colours are white, red, blue, yellow, and green respectively. Girls will be assigned a house at the start of Year 7, which they will stay in throughout their school life, including Sixth Form. Their forms are their houses, so if one was in the Vesey house, they would be in 7V, then 8V, and so on.

From Autumn 2016, the school launched a new house system, taking inspiration from animal constellations, naming the houses Aquila, Cygnus, Delphinus, Pegasus, Phoenix, and Ursa. This was due to an expansion of the school a few years prior, increasing the number of form groups from five to six.

Notable former pupils

 Louise Botting CBE, broadcaster from 1977 to 1992 of Radio 4's Money Box and company director
 Comdt Marjorie Fletcher CBE, director from 1986 to 1988 of the Women's Royal Naval Service (WRNS, disbanded in 1993) 
 Deborah Greenspan (née Scriven). Professor-Emerita of Oral Medicine, University of California, San Francisco, and President from 2006 to 2007 of the International Association for Dental Research
 Shona Lindsay, actress (musicals)
 Monica Pickersgill (née Horton), president from 1998 to 2001 of English Hockey Association (now called England Hockey from 2003), and previously of the All England Women's Hockey Association
 Madeleine Rees OBE, Secretary-General since 2010 of the Women's International League for Peace and Freedom
 Jane Rossington, actress who played Jill in Crossroads
 Louise Latimer, former British No. 1 women's tennis player
 Sarah Thane CBE, chair from May 2000 – June 2002 of the Royal Television Society
 Laura Unsworth MBE, hockey player who was named in the 2012 Team GB Women's Hockey team, and part of the team that won gold at the 2016 Summer Olympics

References

 The school's examination performance
 Sixty Years of Sutton Coldfield Girls' School 1929 – 1989, Jane Thompson, 1989

External links 
 

Girls' schools in the West Midlands (county)
Academies in Birmingham, West Midlands
Grammar schools in Birmingham, West Midlands
Sutton Coldfield
Educational institutions established in 1929
1929 establishments in England